Wielimir is a Polish masculine given name, derived from Slavic wiele ("great, more") + mir ("peace, prestige"). In the Sorbian languages, it is spelled Wjeleměr. It gave its name to Wielmierzowice.

Polish masculine given names